The 2021 Doncaster mayoral election was held on 6 May 2021 to elect the mayor of Doncaster. Incumbent Mayor Ros Jones was seeking reelection.

The supplementary vote system was used to elect the mayor for a four-year term of office. Subsequent elections will be held in May 2025 and every four years thereafter. The election was held alongside a full election for the Doncaster Metropolitan Borough Council, and the South Yorkshire Police and Crime Commissioner.

Candidates

References

2021 English local elections
2020s in South Yorkshire
Doncaster Council elections